Posht-e Tang-e Chenar (also Romanized as Posht-e Tang-e Chenār and Posht Tang-e Chenār; also known as Posht Tang and Posht-e Tang) is a village in Shurab Rural District, Veysian District, Dowreh County, Lorestan Province, Iran. At the 2006 census, its population was 54, in 13 families.

References 

Towns and villages in Dowreh County